Chardon High School (commonly Chardon, Chardon High, or CHS), is a public high school in Chardon, Ohio, USA, serving students in grades 8-12.  The school is part of the Chardon Local School District, with admission based primarily on the location of students' homes.  As of the 2005-06 school year, the school had an enrollment of 1,153 students and 60.2 classroom teachers (on an FTE basis), for a student-teacher ratio of 19.2.

Shooting 

On February 27, 2012, six students were shot at the school by 17-year-old T.J. Lane. According to local news reports, the six victims were chosen at random, countering early reports that a group of students were targeted. Three of the victims died. All Chardon local schools were immediately closed following the shooting, while the high school was put under a lock-down procedure. The entire school district was closed on Tuesday, February 28. The district board also canceled classes in all schools until Friday, with numerous counseling services available until then. On March 19, 2013, Lane was given three life sentences, one for each of the victims killed in the shooting.

Ohio High School Athletic Association State Championships

Boys Track and Field - Nick Elswick - 3200m - 2014
Boys Track and Field - Emil Heineking - 3200m - 2007
Boys Cross Country - Emil Heineking - 2006
Boys Track and Field - Ben Robinson - 800m - 2004
Boys Tennis - Stephen Rozek - 2002
Boys Wrestling - Danny Anderson - 1997
Boys Football - 1994, 2020, 2021
Boys Wrestling - Hank Inderlied - 1985
Boys Wrestling - Mike Davies - 1982, 1983
Girls Cross Country - 1978, 1979
Girls Track and Field - Juanita Vetter - One Mile Run - 1979
Boys Wrestling - Mark Vetter - 1978
Boys Wrestling - Leroy Kemp - 1973, 1974
Boys Cross Country - 1972
Boys Baseball - 2022

Notable alumni
Leroy Kemp, wrestler

References

External links
 District Website

High schools in Geauga County, Ohio
Public high schools in Ohio
High School